The Dijkpoort is a 14th-century citygate in Hattem, the Netherlands. In 1908, the gate was restored in order to house the archives of Hattem under the direction of the city archivist F.A. Hoefer.

It is the only remaining city gate of Hattem, and it was refurbished and partially reconstructed by the architect Pierre Cuypers. A wall walk and corner turrets were added which are recognizable by the different colors of the stones.

Outside of the city beyond this gate, another "front gate" was formerly located with two round towers. A small piece of city wall is still standing that connected the two, where shooting holes for cannon and arquebus can be seen.

Until 2013 the gate was open for auto traffic but it was discovered that this had damaged the gate and restoration activities included closing it to all but pedestrians and cyclists.

References 
 

Buildings and structures in Gelderland
Gates in the Netherlands
Rijksmonuments in Gelderland
Hattem